Assistive technology (AT) is a term for assistive, adaptive, and rehabilitative devices for people with disabilities and the elderly. Disabled people often have difficulty performing activities of daily living (ADLs) independently, or even with assistance. ADLs are self-care activities that include toileting, mobility (ambulation), eating, bathing, dressing, grooming, and personal device care. Assistive technology can ameliorate the effects of disabilities that limit the ability to perform ADLs. Assistive technology promotes greater independence by enabling people to perform tasks they were formerly unable to accomplish, or had great difficulty accomplishing, by providing enhancements to, or changing methods of interacting with, the technology needed to accomplish such tasks. For example, wheelchairs provide independent mobility for those who cannot walk, while assistive eating devices can enable people who cannot feed themselves to do so. Due to assistive technology, disabled people have an opportunity of a more positive and easygoing lifestyle, with an increase in "social participation," "security and control," and a greater chance to "reduce institutional costs without significantly increasing household expenses." In schools, assistive technology can be critical in allowing students with disabilities access the general education curriculum. Students who experience challenges writing or keyboarding, for example, can use voice recognition software instead. Assistive technologies assist people who are recovering from strokes and people who have abstained injuries that effect their daily tasks.

Adaptive technology
Adaptive technology and assistive technology are different. Assistive technology is something that is used to help disabled people, while adaptive technology covers items that are specifically designed for disabled people and would seldom be used by a non-disabled person. In other words, assistive technology is any object or system that helps people with disabilities, while adaptive technology is specifically designed for disabled people. Consequently, adaptive technology is a subset of assistive technology. Adaptive technology often refers specifically to electronic and information technology access.

Occupational therapy
Occupational therapy (OT) is a healthcare profession that specializes in maintaining or improving the quality of life for individuals that experience challenges when independently performing life's occupations.  According to the Occupational Therapy Practice Framework: Domain and Process (3rd ed.; AOTA, 2014), occupations include areas related to all basic and instrumental activities of daily living (ADLs), rest and sleep, education, work, play, leisure and social participation. Occupational therapists have the specialized skill of employing assistive technology (AT) in the improvement and maintenance of optimal, functional participation in occupations.  The application of AT enables an individual to adapt aspects of the environment, that may otherwise be challenging, to the user in order to optimize functional participation in those occupations.  As a result, occupational therapists may educate, recommend, and promote the use of AT to improve the quality of life for their clients.

Mobility impairments

Wheelchairs 

Wheelchairs are devices that can be manually propelled or electrically propelled, and that include a seating system and are designed to be a substitute for the normal mobility that most people have. Wheelchairs and other mobility devices allow people to perform mobility-related activities of daily living which include feeding, toileting, dressing, grooming, and bathing. The devices come in a number of variations where they can be propelled either by hand or by motors where the occupant uses electrical controls to manage motors and seating control actuators through a joystick, sip-and-puff control, head switches or other input devices. Often there are handles behind the seat for someone else to do the pushing or input devices for caregivers. Wheelchairs are used by people for whom walking is difficult or impossible due to illness, injury, or disability. People with both sitting and walking disability often need to use a wheelchair or walker.

Newer advancements in wheelchair design enable wheelchairs to climb stairs, go off-road or propel using segway technology or additional add-ons like handbikes or power assists.

Transfer devices 

Patient transfer devices generally allow patients with impaired mobility to be moved by caregivers between beds, wheelchairs, commodes, toilets, chairs, stretchers, shower benches, automobiles, swimming pools, and other patient support systems (i.e., radiology, surgical, or examining tables).

The most common devices are transfer benches, stretcher or convertible chairs (for lateral, supine transfer), sit-to-stand lifts (for moving patients from one seated position to another i.e., from wheelchairs to commodes), air bearing inflatable mattresses (for supine transfer i.e., transfer from a gurney to an operating room table),  gait belts (or transfer belt) and a slider board (or transfer board), usually used for transfer from a bed to a wheelchair or from a bed to an operating table. Highly dependent patients who cannot assist their caregiver in moving them often require a patient lift (a floor or ceiling-suspended sling lift) which though invented in 1955 and in common use since the early 1960s is still considered the state-of-the-art transfer device by OSHA and the American Nursing Association.

Walkers 
A walker or walking frame or Rollator is a tool for disabled people who need additional support to maintain balance or stability while walking. It consists of a frame that is about waist high, approximately twelve inches deep and slightly wider than the user. Walkers are also available in other sizes, such as for children, or for heavy people. Modern walkers are height-adjustable. The front two legs of the walker may or may not have wheels attached depending on the strength and abilities of the person using it. It is also common to see caster wheels or glides on the back legs of a walker with wheels on the front.

Treadmills
Bodyweight-supported treadmill training (BWSTT) are used to enhance walking ability of people with neurological injury. These machines are therapist-assisted devices that are used in the clinical setting, but is limited by the personnel and labor requirements placed on physical therapists. The BWSTT device, and many others like it, assist physical therapists by providing task-specific practice of walking in people following neurological injury.

Prosthesis 
A prosthesis, prosthetic, or prosthetic limb  is a device that replaces a missing body part. It is part of the field of biomechatronics, the science of using mechanical devices with human muscular, musculoskeletal, and nervous systems to assist or enhance motor control lost by trauma, disease, or defect. Prostheses are typically used to replace parts lost by injury (traumatic) or missing from birth (congenital) or to supplement defective body parts. Inside the body, artificial heart valves are in common use with artificial hearts and lungs seeing less common use but under active technology development. Other medical devices and aids that can be considered prosthetics include hearing aids, artificial eyes, palatal obturator, gastric bands, and dentures.

Prostheses are specifically not orthoses, although given certain circumstances a prosthesis might end up performing some or all of the same functionary benefits as an orthosis.  Prostheses are technically the complete finished item.  For instance, a C-Leg knee alone is not a prosthesis, but only a prosthetic component. The complete prosthesis would consist of the attachment system  to the residual limb — usually a "socket", and all the attachment hardware components all the way down to and including the terminal device. Despite the technical difference, the terms are often used interchangeably.

The terms "prosthetic" and "orthotic" are adjectives used to describe devices such as a prosthetic knee.  The terms "prosthetics" and "orthotics" are used to describe the respective allied health fields.

An Occupational Therapist's role in prosthetics include therapy, training and evaluations. Prosthetic training includes orientation to prosthetics components and terminology, donning and doffing, wearing schedule, and how to care for residual limb and the prosthesis.

Exoskeletons 
A powered exoskeleton is a wearable mobile machine that is powered by a system of electric motors, pneumatics, levers, hydraulics, or a combination of technologies that allow for limb movement with increased strength and endurance. Its design aims to provide back support, sense the user's motion, and send a signal to motors which manage the gears. The exoskeleton supports the shoulder, waist and thigh, and assists movement for lifting and holding heavy items, while lowering back stress.

Adaptive seating and positioning 
People with balance and motor function challenges often need specialized equipment to sit or stand safely and securely. This equipment is frequently specialized for specific settings such as in a classroom or nursing home.  Positioning is often important in seating arrangements to ensure that user's body pressure is distributed equally without inhibiting movement in a desired way.

Positioning devices have been developed to aid in allowing people to stand and bear weight on their legs without risk of a fall.  These standers are generally grouped into two categories based on the position of the occupant.  Prone standers distribute the body weight to the front of the individual and usually have a tray in front of them.  This makes them good for users who are actively trying to carry out some task.  Supine standers distribute the body weight to the back and are good for cases where the user has more limited mobility or is recovering from injury.

For children
Children with severe disabilities can develop learned helplessness, which makes them lose interest in their environment. Robotic arms are used to provide an alternative method to engage in joint play activities. These robotic arms allows children to manipulate real objects in the context of play activities.

Visual impairments 

Many people with serious visual impairments live independently, using a wide range of tools and techniques.  Examples of assistive technology for visually impairment include screen readers, screen magnifiers, Braille embossers, desktop video magnifiers, and voice recorders.

Screen readers 

Screen readers are used to help the visually impaired to easily access electronic information. These software programs run on a computer in order to convey the displayed information through voice (text-to-speech) or braille (refreshable braille displays) in combination with magnification for low vision users in some cases. There are a variety of platforms and applications available for a variety of costs with differing feature sets.

Some example of screen readers are Apple VoiceOver, Google TalkBack and Microsoft Narrator. This software is provided free of charge on all Apple devices. Apple VoiceOver includes the option to magnify the screen, control the keyboard, and provide verbal descriptions to describe what is happening on the screen. There are thirty languages to select from. It also has the capacity to read aloud file content, as well as web pages, E-mail messages, and word processing files.

As mentioned above, screen readers may rely on the assistance of text-to-speech tools. To use the text-to-speech tools, the documents must in an electronic form, that is uploaded as the digital format. However, people usually will use the hard copy documents scanned into the computer, which cannot be recognized by the text-to-speech software. To solve this issue, people always use Optical Character Recognition technology accompanied with text-to-speech software.

Braille and braille technology 

Braille is a system of raised dots formed into units called braille cells. A full braille cell is made up of six dots, with two parallel rows of three dots, but other combinations and quantities of dots represent other letters, numbers, punctuation marks, or words. People can then use their fingers to read the code of raised dots. Assistive technology using braille is called braille technology.

Braille translator 

A braille translator is a computer program that can translate inkprint into braille or braille into inkprint. A braille translator can be an app on a computer or be built into a website, a smartphone, or a braille device.

Braille embosser 

A braille embosser is, simply put, a printer for braille. Instead of a standard printer adding ink onto a page, the braille embosser imprints the raised dots of braille onto a page. Some braille embossers combine both braille and ink so the documents can be read with either sight or touch.

Refreshable braille display 

A refreshable braille display or braille terminal is an electro-mechanical device for displaying braille characters, usually by means of round-tipped pins raised through holes in a flat surface. Computer users who cannot use a computer monitor use it to read a braille output version of the displayed text.

Desktop video magnifier 

Desktop video magnifiers are electronic devices that use a camera and a display screen to perform digital magnification of printed materials. They enlarge printed pages for those with low vision. A camera connects to a monitor that displays real-time images, and the user can control settings such as magnification, focus, contrast, underlining, highlighting, and other screen preferences. They come in a variety of sizes and styles; some are small and portable with handheld cameras, while others are much larger and mounted on a fixed stand.

Screen magnification software 

A screen magnifier is software that interfaces with a computer's graphical output to present enlarged screen content. It allows users to enlarge the texts and graphics on their computer screens for easier viewing. Similar to desktop video magnifiers, this technology assists people with low vision. After the user loads the software into their computer's memory, it serves as a kind of "computer magnifying glass." Wherever the computer cursor moves, it enlarges the area around it. This allows greater computer accessibility for a wide range of visual abilities.

Large-print and tactile keyboards 
A large-print keyboard has large letters printed on the keys.  On the keyboard shown, the round buttons at the top control software which can magnify the screen (zoom in), change the background color of the screen, or make the mouse cursor on the screen larger.  The "bump dots" on the keys, installed in this case by the organization using the keyboards, help the user find the right keys in a tactile way.

Navigation assistance 
Assistive technology for navigation has exploded on the IEEE Xplore database since 2000, with over 7,500 engineering articles written on assistive technologies and visual impairment in the past 25 years, and over 1,300 articles on solving the problem of navigation for people who are blind or visually impaired. As well, over 600 articles on augmented reality and visual impairment have appeared in the engineering literature since 2000. Most of these articles were published within the past 5 years, and the number of articles in this area is increasing every year. GPS, accelerometers, gyroscopes, and cameras can pinpoint the exact location of the user and provide information on what is in the immediate vicinity, and assistance in getting to a destination.

Wearable technology 

Wearable technology are smart electronic devices that can be worn on the body as an implant or an accessory. New technologies are exploring how the visually impaired can receive visual information through wearable devices.

Some wearable devices for visual impairment include: OrCam device, eSight and Brainport.

Personal emergency response systems

Personal emergency response systems (PERS), or Telecare (UK term), are a particular sort of assistive technology that use electronic sensors connected to an alarm system to help caregivers manage risk and help vulnerable people stay independent at home longer. An example would be the systems being put in place for senior people such as fall detectors, thermometers (for hypothermia risk), flooding and unlit gas sensors (for people with mild dementia). Notably, these alerts can be customized to the particular person's risks. When the alert is triggered, a message is sent to a caregiver or contact center who can respond appropriately.

Accessibility software

In human–computer interaction, computer accessibility (also known as accessible computing) refers to the accessibility of a computer system to all people, regardless of disability or severity of impairment, examples include web accessibility guidelines. Another approach is for the user to present a token to the computer terminal, such as a smart card, that has configuration information to adjust the computer speed, text size, etc. to their particular needs. This is useful where users want to access public computer based terminals in Libraries, ATM, Information kiosks etc. The concept is encompassed by the CEN EN 1332-4 Identification Card Systems – Man-Machine Interface. This development of this standard has been supported in Europe by SNAPI and has been successfully incorporated into the Lasseo specifications, but with limited success due to the lack of interest from public computer terminal suppliers.

Hearing impairments

People in the d/Deaf and hard of hearing community have a more difficult time receiving auditory information as compared to hearing individuals. These individuals often rely on visual and tactile mediums for receiving and communicating information. The use of assistive technology and devices provides this community with various solutions to auditory communication needs by providing higher sound (for those who are hard of hearing), tactile feedback, visual cues and improved technology access. Individuals who are deaf or hard of hearing utilize a variety of assistive technologies that provide them with different access to information in numerous environments. Most devices either provide amplified sound or alternate ways to access information through vision and/or vibration. These technologies can be grouped into three general categories: Hearing Technology, alerting devices, and communication support.

Hearing aids 

A hearing aid or deaf aid is an electro-acoustic device which is designed to amplify sound for the wearer, usually with the aim of making speech more intelligible, and to correct impaired hearing as measured by audiometry. This type of assistive technology helps people with hearing loss participate more fully in their hearing communities by allowing them to hear more clearly. They amplify any and all sound waves through use of a microphone, amplifier, and speaker. There is a wide variety of hearing aids available, including digital, in-the-ear, in-the-canal, behind-the-ear, and on-the-body aids.

Assistive listening devices 

Assistive listening devices include FM, infrared, and loop assistive listening devices. This type of technology allows people with hearing difficulties to focus on a speaker or subject by getting rid of extra background noises and distractions, making places like auditoriums, classrooms, and meetings much easier to participate in. The assistive listening device usually uses a microphone to capture an audio source near to its origin and broadcast it wirelessly over an FM (Frequency Modulation) transmission, IR (Infra Red) transmission, IL (Induction Loop) transmission, or other transmission methods. The person who is listening may use an FM/IR/IL Receiver to tune into the signal and listen at his/her preferred volume.

Amplified telephone equipment 

This type of assistive technology allows users to amplify the volume and clarity of their phone calls so that they can easily partake in this medium of communication. There are also options to adjust the frequency and tone of a call to suit their individual hearing needs. Additionally, there is a wide variety of amplified telephones to choose from, with different degrees of amplification. For example, a phone with 26 to 40 decibel is generally sufficient for mild hearing loss, while a phone with 71 to 90 decibel is better for more severe hearing loss.

Augmentative and alternative communication

Augmentative and alternative communication (AAC) is an umbrella term that encompasses methods of communication for those with impairments or restrictions on the production or comprehension of spoken or written language. AAC systems are extremely diverse and depend on the capabilities of the user. They may be as basic as pictures on a board that are used to request food, drink, or other care; or they can be advanced speech generating devices, based on speech synthesis, that are capable of storing hundreds of phrases and words.

Cognitive impairments

Assistive Technology for Cognition (ATC) is the use of technology (usually high tech) to augment and assist cognitive processes such as attention, memory, self-regulation, navigation, emotion recognition and management, planning, and sequencing activity. Systematic reviews of the field have found that the number of ATC are growing rapidly, but have focused on memory and planning, that there is emerging evidence for efficacy, that a lot of scope exists to develop new ATC. Examples of ATC include: NeuroPage which prompts users about meetings, Wakamaru, which provides companionship and reminds users to take medicine and calls for help if something is wrong, and telephone Reassurance systems.

Memory aids 
Memory aids are any type of assistive technology that helps a user learn and remember certain information. Many memory aids are used for cognitive impairments such as reading, writing, or organizational difficulties. For example, a Smartpen records handwritten notes by creating both a digital copy and an audio recording of the text. Users simply tap certain parts of their notes, the pen saves it, and reads it back to them. From there, the user can also download their notes onto a computer for increased accessibility. Digital voice recorders are also used to record "in the moment" information for fast and easy recall at a later time.

A 2017 Cochrane Review highlighted the current lack of high-quality evidence to determine whether assistive technology effectively supports people with dementia to manage memory issues. Thus, it is not presently sure whether or not assistive technology is beneficial for memory problems.

Educational software 

Educational software is software that assists people with reading, learning, comprehension, and organizational difficulties. Any accommodation software such as text readers, notetakers, text enlargers, organization tools, word predictions, and talking word processors falls under the category of educational software.

Eating impairments 

Adaptive eating devices include items commonly used by the general population like spoons and forks and plates. However they become assistive technology when they are modified to accommodate the needs of people who have difficulty using standard cutlery due to a disabling condition. Common modifications include increasing the size of the utensil handle to make it easier to grasp. Plates and bowls may have a guard on the edge that stops food being pushed off of the dish when it is being scooped. More sophisticated equipment for eating includes manual and powered feeding devices. These devices support those who have little or no hand and arm function and enable them to eat independently.

In sports 

Assistive technology in sports is an area of technology design that is growing. Assistive technology is the array of new devices created to enable sports enthusiasts who have disabilities to play. Assistive technology may be used in adaptive sports, where an existing sport is modified to enable players with a disability to participate; or, assistive technology may be used to invent completely new sports with athletes with disabilities exclusively in mind.

An increasing number of people with disabilities are participating in sports, leading to the development of new assistive technology. Assistive technology devices can be simple, or "low-technology", or they may use highly advanced technology. "Low-tech" devices can include velcro gloves and adaptive bands and tubes. "High-tech" devices can include all-terrain wheelchairs and adaptive bicycles. Accordingly, assistive technology can be found in sports ranging from local community recreation to the elite Paralympic Games. More complex assistive technology devices have been developed over time, and as a result, sports for people with disabilities "have changed from being a clinical therapeutic tool to an increasingly competition-oriented activity".

In education
In the United States there are two major pieces of legislation that govern the use of assistive technology within the school system. The first is Section 504 of the Rehabilitation Act of 1973 and the second being the Individuals with Disabilities Education Act (IDEA) which was first enacted in 1975 under the name The Education for All Handicapped Children Act.  In 2004, during the reauthorization period for IDEA, the National Instructional Material Access Center (NIMAC) was created which provided a repository of accessible text including publisher's textbooks to students with a qualifying disability.  Files provided are in XML format and used as a starting platform for braille readers, screen readers, and other digital text software.  IDEA defines assistive technology as follows: "any item, piece of equipment, or product system, whether acquired commercially off the shelf, modified, or customized, that is used to increase, maintain, or improve functional capabilities of a child with a disability. (B) Exception.--The term does not include a medical device that is surgically implanted, or the replacement of such device."

Assistive technology listed is a student's IEP is not only recommended, it is required (Koch, 2017). These devices help students both with and without disabilities access the curriculum in a way they were previously unable to (Koch, 2017). Occupational therapists play an important role in educating students, parents and teachers about the assistive technology they may interact with.

Assistive technology in this area is broken down into low, mid, and high tech categories. Low tech encompasses equipment that is often low cost and does not include batteries or requires charging. Examples include adapted paper and pencil grips for writing or masks and color overlays for reading. Mid tech supports used in the school setting include the use of handheld spelling dictionaries and portable word processors used to keyboard writing. High tech supports involve the use of tablet devices and computers with accompanying software. Software supports for writing include the use of auditory feedback while keyboarding, word prediction for spelling, and speech to text. Supports for reading include the use of text to speech (TTS) software and font modification via access to digital text. Limited supports are available for math instruction and mostly consist of grid based software to allow younger students to keyboard equations and auditory feedback of more complex equations using MathML and Daisy.

Computer accessibility

One of the largest problems that affect disabled people is discomfort with prostheses. An experiment performed in Massachusetts utilized 20 people with various sensors attached to their arms. The subjects tried different arm exercises, and the sensors recorded their movements. All of the data helped engineers develop new engineering concepts for prosthetics.

Assistive technology may attempt to improve the ergonomics of the devices themselves such as Dvorak and other alternative keyboard layouts, which offer more ergonomic layouts of the keys.
Assistive technology devices have been created to enable disabled people to use modern touch screen mobile computers such as the iPad, iPhone and iPod Touch. The Pererro is a plug and play adapter for iOS devices which uses the built in Apple VoiceOver feature in combination with a basic switch. This brings touch screen technology to those who were previously unable to use it. Apple, with the release of iOS 7 had introduced the ability to navigate apps using switch control. Switch access could be activated either through an external bluetooth connected switch, single touch of the screen, or use of right and left head turns using the device's camera. Additional accessibility features include the use of Assistive Touch which allows a user to access multi-touch gestures through pre-programmed onscreen buttons.

For users with physical disabilities a large variety of switches are available and customizable to the user's needs varying in size, shape, or amount of pressure required for activation. Switch access may be placed near any area of the body which has consistent and reliable mobility and less subject to fatigue. Common sites include the hands, head, and feet. Eye gaze and head mouse systems can also be used as an alternative mouse navigation. A user may utilize single or multiple switch sites and the process often involves a scanning through items on a screen and activating the switch once the desired object is highlighted.

Home automation
The form of home automation called assistive domotics focuses on making it possible for elderly and disabled people to live independently. Home automation is becoming a viable option for the elderly and disabled who would prefer to stay in their own homes rather than move to a healthcare facility. This field uses much of the same technology and equipment as home automation for security, entertainment, and energy conservation but tailors it towards elderly and disabled users. For example, automated prompts and reminders utilize motion sensors and pre-recorded audio messages; an automated prompt in the kitchen may remind the resident to turn off the oven, and one by the front door may remind the resident to lock the door.

Assistive technology and innovation 

Innovation is happening in assistive technology either through improvements to existing devices or the creation of new products.

In the WIPO published 2021 report on Technology Trends, assistive products are grouped into either conventional or emerging technologies. Conventional assisting technology tracks innovation within well-established assistive products, whereas emerging assistive technology refers to more advanced products. These identified advanced assistive products are distinguished from the conventional ones by the use of one or more enabling technologies (for instance, artificial intelligence, Internet of Things, advanced sensors, new material, additive manufacturing, advanced robotics, augmented and virtual reality) or by the inclusion of implantable products/components. Such emerging assistive products are either more sophisticated or more functional versions of conventional assistive products, or completely novel assistive devices.

For instance, in conventional self-care assistive technology, technologies involved typically include adaptive clothing, adaptive eating devices, incontinence products, assistive products for manicure, pedicure, hair and facial care, dental care, or assistive products for sexual activities. In comparison, emerging self-care assistive technologies include health and emotion monitoring, smart diapers, smart medication dispensing and management or feeding assistant robot. Although the distinction between conventional and emerging technologies is not always clear-cut, emerging assistive technology tends to be "smarter", using AI and being more connected and interactive, and including body-integrated solutions or components.

To a great extent this « conventional » versus « emerging » classification is based on the WHO's Priority Assistive Products List  and the ISO 9999 standard for assistive products for persons with disabilities, the APL delineating the absolute minimum that countries should be offering to their citizens and ISO 9999 defining those products which are already well established in the market.

This "well-established status" is reflected in the patent filings between 2013 and 2017. Patent registrations for assistive technologies identified as conventional are nearly eight times larger than the ones for emerging assistive technologies. However, patent filings related to more recent emerging assistive technologies are growing almost three times as fast as those pertaining to conventional ones. Patent filings in both conventional and emerging assistive technology are highly concentrated on mobility, hearing and vision. Investment in emerging assistive technology also focuses on environment. In the conventional sector, mobility represent 54% of all patents fillings, and is an indication of increased interest in advanced mobility assistive product categories, such as advanced prosthetics, walking aids, wheelchairs, and exoskeletons.

In the past, the top patent offices for filing, and therefore perceived target markets, in assistive technology have been the U.S. and Japan. Patenting activity has, however, been declining in these two jurisdictions. At the same time, there has been a surge in patent filings in China and an increase in filings in the Republic of Korea. This pattern is observed for both conventional and emerging assistive technology, with China's annual filings surpassing those of the U.S. in 2008 for conventional and 2014 for emerging assistive technology. Patent filings related to conventional assistive technology have also declined in Europe, especially in Germany, France, the Netherlands and Norway.

Patenting activity indicates the amount of interest and the investment made in respect to an invention's applicability and its commercialization potential. There is typically a lag between filing a patent application and commercialization, with a product being classified in various stages of readiness levels, research concept, proof of concept, minimum viable product and finally commercial product. According to the 2021 WIPO report, the emerging technologies closest to a fully commercial product were for example:

 myoelectric control of advanced prosthetics and wheelchair control (mobility),
 environment-controlling hearing aids (hearing), 
 multifocal intraocular lenses and artificial retina, along with Virtual and Augmented Reality wearables (vision);
 smart assistants and navigation aids (communication);
 smart home appliances (environment);  
 medication management and smart diapers (self-care).
The technology readiness level and the related patenting activity can also be explained through the following factors which contribute to a product's entry to market, such as the expected impact on a person's participation in different aspects of life, the ease of adoption (need for training, fitting, additional equipment for interoperability, and so on), the societal acceptance and potential ethical concerns, and the need for regulatory approval. This is mainly the case for assistive technology that qualifies as medical technology.

Among these aspects, acceptability and ethical considerations are particularly relevant to those technologies that are extremely invasive (such as cortical or auditory brainstem implants), or replace the human caregiver and human interaction, or collect and use data on cloud-based services or interconnected devices (e.g., companion robots, smart nursing and health-monitoring technologies), raising privacy issues and requiring connectivity, or raise safety concerns, such as autonomous wheelchairs.

Beyond the patent landscape, industrial designs have an added importance for the field of assistive technology. Assistive technology is often not adopted, or else abandoned entirely, because of issues to do with design (lack of appeal) or comfort (poor ergonomics). Design often plays a role after the patenting activity, as a product needs to be re-designed for mass production.

Impacts 
Overall, assistive technology aims to allow disabled people to "participate more fully in all aspects of life (home, school, and community)" and increases their opportunities for "education, social interactions, and potential for meaningful employment". It creates greater independence and control for disabled individuals. For example, in one study of 1,342 infants, toddlers and preschoolers, all with some kind of developmental, physical, sensory, or cognitive disability, the use of assistive technology created improvements in child development. These included improvements in "cognitive, social, communication, literacy, motor, adaptive, and increases in engagement in learning activities". Additionally, it has been found to lighten caregiver load.  Both family and professional caregivers benefit from assistive technology. Through its use, the time that a family member or friend would need to care for a patient significantly decreases. However, studies show that care time for a professional caregiver increases when assistive technology is used. Nonetheless, their work load is significantly easier as the assistive technology frees them of having to perform certain tasks. There are several platforms that use machine learning to identify the appropriate assistive device to suggest to patients, making assistive devices more accessible.

History
In 1988 the National institute on disability and rehabilitation research, NIDRR, awarded Gaulladet University a grant for the project "Robotic finger spelling hand for communication and access to text by deaf-blind persons." Researchers at the university developed and tested a robotic hand. Although it was never commercialized the concept is relevant for current and future research.

Since this grant, many others have been written. NIDRR funded research appears to be moving from the fabrication of robotic arms that can be used by disabled persons to perform daily activities, to developing robotics that assist with therapy in the hopes of achieving long-term performance gains. If there is success in development of robotics, these mass-marketed products could assist tomorrow's longer-living elderly individuals enough to postpone nursing home stays. "Jim Osborn, executive director of the Quality of Life Technology Center, told a 2007 gathering of long-term care providers that if such advances could delay all nursing home admissions by a month, societal savings could be $1 billion monthly." Shortage of both paid personal assistants and available family members makes artificial assistance a necessity.

See also

 Accessibility
 Assisted Living
 Augmentative and alternative communication
 Braille technology
 Design for All (in ICT)
 Disability Flag
 Durable medical equipment
 Matching person and technology model
 OATS: Open Source Assistive Technology Software
 Occupational Therapy
 Powered exoskeleton
 Rehabilitation robotics
 Soft robotics
 Transgenerational design
 Universal access to education

References

Bibliography
 
 
 
 
 
 
 
 
 
 
 Assistive Technology in Education: A Teacher's Guide, Amy Foxwell, 15 February 2022

 
Educational technology
Web accessibility